The B.C. Era Deuce EP is an EP by American rapper Bobby Creekwater, released under BGOV, Shady and Interscope and proceeded The B.C. Era EP. The album contains eleven tracks almost all produced by himself and D. Focis, and only one song was produced by Junior Varsity. It features guest appearances from Mykey, Bohagon, Mykel, Jimmy Cravity, Charlie Skrill, Stat Quo, and Sandman.

Track listing

Personnel 
 Bobby Creekwater - vocals, producer
 D. Focis - producer

Additional personnel 
 Junior Varsity - producer on "Spaceship"
 Mykey - additional performer on "Hey"
 Bohagon - additional performer on "Dreamin'"
 Mykel - additional performer on "Dreamin'"
 Jimmy Cravity - additional performer on "Winner"
 Charlie Skrill - additional performer on "Ridin' Muzik"
 Stat Quo - additional performer on "Tryin' to Make It"
 Sandman - additional performer on "Tryin' to Make It"

2009 EPs